Terry Hall may refer to:

Terry Hall (singer) (1959–2022), English singer with The Specials, Fun Boy Three, The Colourfield
Terry Hall (ventriloquist) (1926–2007), English ventriloquist who worked with his puppet, Lenny the Lion
Terry and Lander Halls, two connected residential towers on the south campus of the University of Washington

See also
Terry House (disambiguation)